Indian Bank is a central public sector bank under the ownership of Ministry of Finance, Government of India. It was established in 1907 and headquartered in Chennai. It serves over 100 million customers with 39,734 employees, 5,721 branches with 5,428 ATMs and Cash deposit machines. Total business of the bank has touched  as on 31 March 2022.

The bank's Information systems and security processes are certified to meet ISO27001:2013 standard. It has overseas branches in Colombo and Singapore including Foreign Currency Banking Units at Colombo and Jaffna. It has 227 overseas correspondent banks in 75 countries. Since 1969, the Government of India has owned the bank. As per the announcement made by the Indian Finance Minister Nirmala Sitharaman on 30 August 2019, Allahabad Bank merged from 1 April 2020, making Indian Bank now the seventh largest bank in the country.

History

Early formation and expansion
In the last quarter of 1906, Madras (now Chennai) was hit by the worst financial crisis the city was ever to suffer. Of the three best-known British commercial names in 19th-century Madras, one crashed; a second had to be resurrected by a distress sale; and the third had to be bailed out by a benevolent benefactor. Arbuthnot & Co, which failed, was considered the soundest of the three. Parry's (now EID Parry), may have been the earliest of them and Binny and Co.'s founders may have had the oldest associations with Madras, but it was Arbuthnot, established in 1810s, that was the city's strongest commercial organisation in the 19th Century. A key figure in the bankruptcy case for Arbuthnot's was the Madras lawyer, V. Krishnaswamy Iyer who founded the Indian bank which was an offshoot of nationalistic fervour and the Swadeshi movement, when the then British Arbuthnot Bank collapsed and the Indian Bank emerged. Mr V. Krishnaswamy Iyer solicited the support of the Nagarathar Chettiars authored by Mr. Ramasamy Chettiar, who was Annamalai Chettiar's elder brother. Sri V. Krishnaswamy Iyer and Mr. Ramasamy Chettiar were one of the first directors of Indian Bank. Later on in 1915,
Mr. Annamalai Chettiar was inducted into the board of the Indian Bank. It commenced operations on 15 August 1907 with its head office in Parry's Building, Parry Corner, Madras.

In 1932 IB opened a branch in Colombo. It opened its second branch in Ceylon in 1935 at Jaffna, but closed it in 1939. IB next opened a branch in Rangoon, Burma, in late 1940s. Then in late 1941 IB opened branches in Singapore, Kuala Lumpur, Ipoh, and Penang. The exigencies of war forced IB to close its Singapore and Malayan branches with months. The closing of the Singapore branch resulted in little loss to IB; the loss of the branches in Malaya was much more costly.

World War II resulted in further financial problems for IB and it was forced in 1942 to close a number of its branches in India, and also its branch in Colombo.

Post Independence of India

After the war, in 1947, it reopened its branch in Colombo. Indian Bank also reopened its branches in Burma, Malayan and Singapore, the last in 1962. The Burmese government nationalised all foreign banks, including Indian Bank's branch, in 1963.

The 1960s saw IB expand domestically as it acquired Rayalaseema Bank (est. 1939), Mannargudi Bank (est. 1932), Bank of Alagapuri, Salem Bank (est. 1925), and Trichy United Bank. Trichy United was the result of the 1965 merger of Woraiyur Commercial Bank (est. 1948), the Palakkarai Bank, and the Tennur Bank (est. 3 March 1947). These were all small banks with the result that all the acquisitions added only about 38 branches to IB's network. Trichy United had five branches and its acquisition in 1967 brought the number of IB branches up to 210.

Then on 19 July 1969 the Government of India nationalised 14 top banks, including Indian Bank. One consequence of the nationalisation was that the Malaysian branches of nationalised Indian banks were forbidden to continue to operate as branches of the parent. At the time, Indian Bank had three branches, and Indian Overseas Bank, and United Commercial Bank had eight between them. In 1973 the three established United Asian Bank Berhad to amalgamate and take over their Malaysian operations. Post-nationalization, Indian Bank was left with only two foreign branches, one in Colombo and the other in Singapore.

International expansion resumed in 1978 with IB becoming a technical adviser to PT Bank Rama in Indonesia, the result of the merger of PT Bank Masyarakat and PT Bank Ramayana. Two years later, IB, Bank of Baroda, and Union Bank of India established IUB International Finance, a licensed deposit taker in Hong Kong. Each of the three banks took an equal share in the joint venture; IB's Chairman became the first Chairman of IUB International Finance. In May 1980s, IB also opened a foreign currency unit at its branch in Colombo.

In 1981 IB set up its first Regional Rural Bank, Sri Venkateswara Grameena Bank, in Chittoor.

Post nationalisation
In 1983, ethnic sectarian violence in the form of anti-Tamil riots resulted in the burning of Indian Overseas Bank's branch in Colombo. Indian Bank, which may have had stronger ties to the Sinhalese population, escaped unscathed.

In 1990, Indian Bank rescued Bank of Tanjore (Bank of Thanjavur; est. 1901), with its 157 branches, based in Tamil Nadu.

A multi-crore scam was exposed in 1992, when then chairman M. Gopalakrishnan lent 13 billion to small corporates and exporters from the south, which the borrowers never repaid.

Bank of Baroda bought out its partners in IUB International Finance in Hong Kong in 1998. Apparently this was a response to regulatory changes following Hong Kong's reversion to Chinese control. IUB became Bank of Baroda (Hong Kong), a restricted licence bank.

Amalgamation
On 30 August 2019, Finance Minister Nirmala Sitharaman announced that Allahabad Bank would be merged with Indian bank. The Union Cabinet approved the merger on 4 March 2020. Indian Bank assumed control of Allahabad Bank on 1 April 2020.

Key Milestones

1907- The Bank was incorporated on 5 March 1907 under the Indian Companies Act, 1882 as "Indian Bank Limited" and commenced operations on 15 August 1907.

1932 - The Bank opened its Colombo branch.

1941 - The Bank opened its Singapore branch

1962 - The Bank acquired the Royalaseema Bank, the Bank of Alagapuri, the Salem Bank, the Mannargudi Bank and the Trichy United Bank

1969 - The Bank was nationalized. It was appointed as the lead bank for nine districts in the States of Tamil Nadu, Andhra Pradesh and Kerala and the Union Territory of Pondicherry.

1970 - The Head Office of the Bank was shifted to its own building

1981 - The first regional rural bank sponsored by the Bank, Sri Venkateswara Grameena Bank, was founded

1989 - Indbank Merchant Banking Services was incorporated as a subsidiary of the Bank 1990; Bank of Thanjavur Limited (with 157 branches) was amalgamated

1991 - Ind Bank Housing Limited was incorporated as a subsidiary

1994 - Indfund Management Limited was established to manage the operations of Indian Bank Mutual Fund

2006-07 - The Bank entered into a strategic alliance with Oriental Bank of Commerce and Corporation Bank

2012 - Scheme of Amalgamation of M/s. lndfund Management Limited, a wholly owned subsidiary of the Bank with Indian Bank, Indian Bank.

2020 - On 1 April 2020 Indian bank and Allahabad bank merged. The oldest Joint Stock Bank in the country, Allahabad Bank was founded on 24 April 1865 by a group of Europeans at Allahabad, at a juncture when organized industries, trade and banking were taking shape in India. Thus, the history of the bank now spreads over three centuries.

See also

 Banking in India
 List of banks in India
 Reserve Bank of India
 Indian Financial System Code
 List of largest banks
 List of companies of India
 Make in India

References

Cited sources

External links

 Indian Bank's official website

Public Sector Banks in India
Banks established in 1907
Financial services companies based in Chennai
Banks of India
Indian companies established in 1907